Yeskino is a rural locality (a village) in Korobitsynskoye Rural Settlement, Syamzhensky District, Vologda Oblast, Russia. The population was 18 as of 2002.

Geography 
Yeskino is located 38 km northeast of Syamzha (the district's administrative centre) by road. Borisovskaya is the nearest rural locality.

References 

Rural localities in Syamzhensky District